Speidel or von Speidel is a surname. Notable people with the surname include:

Albert von Speidel (1858–1912), Bavarian general and artistic director of the court theatre in Munich after 1905
Bill Speidel also William C Speidel (1912–1988), American author
Edmund Freiherr von Speidel (1816–1887), Bavarian general and court marshal
Emil Speidel (1859–1938), German professor in Tübingen and upper level forestry council member
Hans Speidel (1897–1984), German general
Hans-Georg von Seidel (1891–1955), German general of the Luftwaffe
Johann Jakob Speidel (1595?–1666), German jurist
Jutta Speidel (born 1954), German actress
Michael P. Speidel (born 1937), German-born American military historian
Maximilian von Speidel (1856–1943), Bavarian general and State Council
Charles E. Speidel (born 1969), French American Entrepreneur.

Persons named Speidell include:
John Speidell, compiler of an early table of logarithms
Todd H. Speidell, theologian

German-language surnames